Re Golay’s Will Trusts [1965] 1 WLR 969 is an English trusts law case, concerning the requirement of subject matter to be sufficiently certain.

Facts
Adrian Golay wrote a will saying that he wanted Mrs Bridgewater ‘to enjoy one of my flats during her lifetime and to receive a reasonable income from my other properties …’ The will was challenged and it was questioned whether the clause was certain enough to be enforced, because it was not clear which flat, or what income would be reasonable.

Judgment
Ungoed-Thomas J held the trust was sufficiently certain.

See also

English trust law

Notes

References

English trusts case law
High Court of Justice cases
1965 in case law
1965 in British law